"Keep Me in Mind" was a No. 1 country hit for vocalist and entertainer Lynn Anderson in 1973,  and was the title track of an album released the same year.

Background
This song was one of 11 No. 1 country hits for Anderson. Her career was still going strong three years after her major crossover hit, "(I Never Promised You A) Rose Garden". By this time, Anderson's material had changed to more sophisticated country music, Countrypolitan, which was all about producing and recording more pop-oriented songs in order for country singers to attract a larger listening audience. Even though this song had no hint of traditional country, the song did not make the Billboard's Pop Hot 100 chart. However, she would crossover onto the pop charts with future hits.

Chart performance

References
 

Songs written by Glenn Sutton
Lynn Anderson songs
1973 singles
Songs written by George Richey
Columbia Records singles
Song recordings produced by Glenn Sutton